Owston may refer to:

Owston, Leicestershire, England
Owston Ferry, a village in Lincolnshire, England
Owston, South Yorkshire, England
Owston Islands in Antarctica

People with the surname
Alan Owston, naturalist
George Owston, English cricketer 
P. G. Owston (1921–2001), British chemist and crystallographer for whom the Owston Islands in Antarctica are named
John de St Paul (c. 1295 – 1362), who was also known as John de Owston, the Archbishop of Dublin and Chancellor of Ireland

See also
Owston's green tree frog
Owston's palm civet
Owston's chimaera
Doug Owston Correctional Centre